The M260 and M264 are turbocharged inline-four engines produced by Mercedes-Benz since 2017. It is the successor to the M270 and M274 engine.

Design 
Both engines are based upon the outgoing M270 and the M274 respectively. Like the M270 and the M274, the M260 refers to the transverse configuration (for front-wheel drive models) while the M264 refers to the longitudinally mounted engine (for rear-wheel drive models). They use dual overhead camshafts with 4 valves per cylinder, feature twin-scroll turbochargers, and have particulate filters installed. M264 engines also have intake variable valve timing and a 48V system that powers the electric auxiliary compressor and integrated starter alternator. However, unlike M256 which uses a BorgWarner electric auxiliary compressor, the M264 has a belt-driven starter-alternator combo as well as a 48V electric water pump.

Models

M260 E20 DE LA 
 2018–2021 W177 A220, C118 CLA220
 2019–present W177 A35 AMG 4MATIC
 2019–present W177 A250, C118 CLA250
 2019–present C118 CLA 35 AMG 4MATIC

M264 E15 DEH LA 
 2018–2021 W205 C200 (with EQ Boost)
2019–2021 W205 C180
 2019–present W213 E180 (without EQ Boost for Pakistan, Singapore & Egypt)
 2020–present C257 CLS260 (Chinese market)
 2021–present W206 C180 (with EQ Boost)
 2021–present W206 C200 (with EQ Boost)

M264 E20 DEH LA 
 2018–2020 W213 E 350
2019–present W213 E 300 (with EQ Boost)
2019–present W213 E 200 (with EQ Boost)
 2018–2021 W205 C 300 (with EQ Boost)
 2018–present C257 CLS 350
2019–2020 V222 S 350 (China)
 2020–present X253/C253 GLC 200
 2020–present X253/C253 GLC 300
 2020–present W463 (Second generation) G 350 (Chinese Spec) with EQ Boost

References

External links 
 Press release

Mercedes-Benz engines
Straight-four engines
Gasoline engines by model